For Those Aboot To Rock: Live at the Commodore is a live performance DVD by the Canadian Heavy Metal band Strapping Young Lad, released in 2004 by Century Media. A CD version was released along with the 2013 "Metal for the Masses" reissue of City to celebrate Century Media's 25th anniversary.

Track listing

Extra features

Credits
Devin Townsend – guitar, sound effects, vocals, production, engineering
Gene Hoglan – drums
Jed Simon – guitar, vocals
Byron Stroud – bass
Munesh Sami - keyboards
Tim Bavis – engineering
Greg Reely – engineering
Bryan Seely – sound effects, assistant
Shaun Thingvold – mixing
Marcus Rogers – director, editing
Phil Hinkle – A&R

2004 video albums
2004 live albums
Strapping Young Lad live albums
Strapping Young Lad video albums
Live video albums
Century Media Records live albums
Century Media Records video albums
Albums produced by Devin Townsend